Kyarkoppa is a village in Dharwad district of Karnataka, India.

Demographics 
As of the 2011 Census of India there were 590 households in Kyarkoppa and a total population of 2,869 consisting of 1,474 males and 1,395 females. There were 417 children ages 0-6.

References

Villages in Dharwad district